The Copa Apertura 1990 was the 20th edition of the Chilean Cup tournament. The competition started on March 18, 1990, and concluded on June 3, 1990. Only first level teams took part in the tournament. Colo-Colo won the competition for their eighth time, beating Universidad Católica 3–2 on extra-time in the final.  The points system in the first round awarded 2 points for a win, increased to 3 points if the team scored 4 or more goals. In the event of a tie, each team was awarded 1 point, but no points were awarded if the score was 0–0.

Calendar

Group Round

Group 1

Group 2

Quarterfinals

Semifinals

Third place match

Final

Lineups in the Final

 Colo-Colo:
 Daniel Morón; Rubén Espinoza, Eduardo Vilches, Lizardo Garrido, Javier Margas; Raúl Ormeño, Jaime Pizarro, Sergio Díaz, Marcelo Barticciotto (84' Guillermo Carreño), Ricardo Dabrowski, Rubén Martínez (72' Miguel Ramírez).
 DT: Arturo Salah.
 ----------------------------------------------------------------------------------------------
 Universidad Católica:
 Marco Cornez; Rodrigo Blasco, Pablo Yoma, Hugo Monardes; Fabian Estay, Nelson Parraguez, Luis Pérez, Jorge Contreras, Gerardo Reinoso, Rodrigo Barrera (76' Francisco Hórmann), Raimundo Tupper.
 DT: Ignacio Prieto.

Top goalscorers
Adrián Czornomaz (Cobreloa) 13 goals
Aníbal González (O'Higgins) 13 goals
Gerardo Reinoso (Universidad Católica) 13 goals

See also
 1990 Campeonato Nacional

References
Revista Minuto 90, (Santiago, Chile) March–June 1990 (scores & information)
Solofutbol

Copa Chile
Chile
1990